Philip John Sandercock (born 21 June 1953) is a former professional footballer, who played for Torquay United, Huddersfield Town, Northampton Town and Nuneaton Borough.

References

1953 births
Living people
English footballers
Footballers from Plymouth, Devon
Association football defenders
English Football League players
Torquay United F.C. players
Huddersfield Town A.F.C. players
Northampton Town F.C. players
Nuneaton Borough F.C. players